Custe o Que Custar (In English, Whatever it Takes, represented by the acronym CQC) was a program that brought together journalism and humor on Brazilian television, produced by Eyeworks and broadcast weekly by Rede Bandeirantes from 2008 to 2015.

In total, it had eight seasons and 339 episodes. The format is based on the original Argentinean Caiga quien caiga, created by Mario Pergolini and Diego Guebel, in 1995. The attraction was awarded in several categories with the main awards on Brazilian television, such as the APCA, Press Trophy and the Brasil Quality Art Award .

Marcelo Tas acted as co-director in the implementation of the Brazilian version of "Caiga Quien Caiga" and was host from 2008 to 2014.
In the last year of the program, the host was Dan Stulbach, and has Marco Luque and Rafael Cortez on his team. [1] The reports are conducted by Mauricio Meirelles (enrolled in November 2011), [2] Lucas Salles (who joined the program in 2014), [3] Juliano Dip and Erick Krominski (both since 2015). [4] [5]

The program covered weekly events in politics, arts and sports, from a humorous and satirical point of view. He often used metalanguage to satirize the show itself in live broadcasts and introduce subject matter graphics and sound effects. [6]

The format comes from Argentina, when it originated under the name Caiga Quien Caiga, created in 1995 by Mario Pergolini.

Cast

Presenters
 Current presenter
 Previous presenter(s)

Reporters

 Current reporter
 Previous reporter(s)

References

External links

  Official site

Brazilian comedy television series
Rede Bandeirantes original programming
2008 Brazilian television series debuts
2015 Brazilian television series endings
2000s Brazilian television series
2010s Brazilian television series
Portuguese-language television shows